The Men's under-23 time trial of the 2018 UCI Road World Championships was a cycling event that took place on 24 September 2018 in Innsbruck, Austria. It was the 23rd edition of the event, for which Danish rider Mikkel Bjerg was the defending champion, having won in 2017. 71 riders from 42 nations entered the competition, held over a rolling route  in length, starting from Wattens and ending in Innsbruck.

Bjerg became the first rider to win a second under-23 world time trial title, finishing 33.47 seconds clear of his closest competitor, Belgium's Brent Van Moer. The podium placings were completed by Bjerg's Danish team-mate Mathias Norsgaard, a further 4.83 seconds behind Van Moer.

Qualification
All National Federations were allowed to enter four riders for the race, with a maximum of two riders to start. In addition to this number, the outgoing World Champion and the current continental champions were also able to take part.

Continental and defending World champions

Participating nations
71 cyclists from 42 nations were scheduled to take part in the men's under-23 time trial. However, one rider – Syria's Tarek Al Moakee – did not start, therefore reducing the event to 70 competitors from 41 nations. The number of cyclists per nation is shown in parentheses.

Final classification
All 70 race starters completed the -long course.

References

External links

 Individual time trial page at Innsbruck-Tirol 2018 website

Men's under-23 time trial
UCI Road World Championships – Men's under-23 time trial